In early Polish history, the given name Ryksa may refer to:

 Ryksa (Hilderyka, Brunhilda), sometimes mistakenly named as the German wife of the legendary 9th-century Polish ruler Popiel; however, the actual real name of Popiel's wife has not been specified by early historians.
 Blessed Richeza of Lotharingia or Ryksa (around 1063), Queen of Poland, wife of King Mieszko II (1025–1031).
 Ryksa (1018 - after 1059), possible name of wife of Béla "filia Miskæ (Polonorum duce)" as recorded in "The Gesta Hungarorum,  (Europäische Stammtafeln).
 Richeza of Sweden, Queen of Poland, known as Ryksa, spouse of King Przemysł II, born before 1273, deceased before 1293.
 Elizabeth Richeza of Poland (Czech: Eliška-Rejčka; Polish: Ryksa-Elżbieta; 1288–1335), queen consort of Bohemia and of Poland, and Duchess consort of Austria and Styria

See also 
 Rzepicha, wife of the semi-legendary Piast Kołodziej (the Wheelwright)

Sources